Talakivka is an urban-type settlement in Mariupol Raion of Donetsk Oblast in eastern Ukraine, at 89.4 km SSW from the centre of Donetsk city, at a distance of 19 km north from the centre of Mariupol, on the right bank of the Kalmius river. Population: .

Demographics
In 2001 the settlement had a population of 4160. Native language as of the Ukrainian Census of 2001:
Ukrainian 10.31%
Russian 89.47%
Greek 0.10%
Belorussian 0.07%

Dynamics of population has been as follows:

References

Mariupol Raion

Urban-type settlements in Mariupol Raion